Smoke Rings is a compilation album of phonograph records released by Victor Records in 1944 featuring Swing-era recordings of eight bandleaders as a part of their Musical Smart Set series. The set was released in conjunction with Up Swing during the American Federation of Musicians strike and features popular recordings by the various artists.

Reception
The album's sides were titled Big Hit of, with the year released after; Smoke Rings features songs from 1936 to 1943. This could be misleading: According to Joel Whitburn, the four songs by bandleaders Benny Goodman, Tommy Dorsey, Larry Clinton and Glenn Miller were all number one hits. Ellington's "I Got It Bad" hit only the 17th position, while Artie Shaw's "All The Things You Are" and Freddy Martin's "Intermezzo" placed inside the top ten, at numbers 8 and 7 respectively. Kaye's version of "Moon Love" did not chart.

Despite the fact sister album Up Swing charted, Smoke Rings did not. Billboard magazine described the album in April 1944 as featuring "sentimental oldies". Both releases may have been to make up for lost sales:
Victor's cancellation of the contracts to Oklahoma and Carmen Jones was a solid sock, as the Oklahoma album has sold almost 300,000 copies, the greatest album sale in the history of the disk biz.

Track listing
These previously issued songs were featured on a 4-disc, 78 rpm album set, Victor P-147.

Disc 1: (20-1557)

Disc 2: (20-1558)

Disc 3: (20-1559)

Disc 4: (20-1560)

References

Benny Goodman albums
Tommy Dorsey albums
Duke Ellington albums
Glenn Miller compilation albums
1944 albums
RCA Victor compilation albums